Bradley Ryan Meester (born March 23, 1977) is a former American football center for the Jacksonville Jaguars of the National Football League (NFL). He was drafted by the Jaguars in the second round of the 2000 NFL Draft. He played college football at University of Northern Iowa.

Early years
Meester attended Aplington–Parkersburg High School in Parkersburg, Iowa, and was a good student and a letterman in football, basketball, baseball, and track & field. He was the South Butler FFA Chapter President. Meester graduated from Aplington–Parkersburg in 1995 with a 3.80 grade point average.

College career
At Northern Iowa, Meester was a four-year starter at center and a three-time All-Gateway Conference first-team selection. He was named to the Division I-AA Associated Press and Coaches All-America team as a senior. He also made the 1999 GTE Academic All-America team.

Also an outstanding student, Meester graduated with a degree in business management and 3.76 GPA.

Professional career

2000 NFL Draft
Regarded as the No. 2 center available in the 2000 NFL Draft behind John St. Clair, Meester was the first center chosen, selected with the 60th overall pick by the Jacksonville Jaguars. He tied with Michael Cheever (1996) as the highest-drafted centers ever by the team. Meester also was the highest Northern Iowa draftee since James Jones in 1991.

Jacksonville Jaguars
Meester was drafted in the second round by the Jacksonville Jaguars where he started all 16 games in his rookie season. He was only the third rookie in Jaguars history to start all 16 games. In 2003, he moved from left guard to center following the departure of free agent John Wade. He is the only Jaguar to start his first 92 regular season games. His streak was ended on December 4, 2005, when he suffered a torn biceps tendon in a game against the Cleveland Browns.

An unrestricted free agent in the 2009 offseason, Meester was re-signed by the Jaguars on February 27.

Meester became a free agent on March 12, 2013, and was re-signed by the team on March 19.

On December 18, 2013, Meester announced that he would retire after the 2013 season after playing his entire career with the Jaguars. On December 22 in a game against the Tennessee Titans, Meester recorded his first career reception on a screen pass from Chad Henne for nine yards and a first down.

Meester retired as the Jaguar franchise record holder for seasons played (14), games played (209), games started (209) and consecutive games started (92).

Family 
Meester and his wife, Jamie, have six daughters and live in Iowa. Chloe plays volleyball. He enjoys riding and restoring motorcycles, deer hunting and gator hunting.

References

External links
Jacksonville Jaguars bio

1977 births
Living people
People from Iowa Falls, Iowa
American football centers
Northern Iowa Panthers football players
Jacksonville Jaguars players
People from Parkersburg, Iowa
Ed Block Courage Award recipients